Kit Kovacs is a marine mammal researcher, best known for her work on biology, conservation and management of whales and seals. She is based at the Norwegian Polar Institute (NPI), Tromsø and is an Adjunct professor of biology, Marine Biology, at the University Centre in Svalbard (UNIS).

Early life and education
Kovacs was born in Germany and has Canadian citizenship. She received her H.B.Sc. (Biology) in 1979 from York University, Toronto, Canada. In 1982, she was awarded a Master of Science degree in Biology by the Lakehead University at Thunder Bay. Her doctorate (Ph.D) in Zoology was awarded by the University of Guelph (Guelph) in 1986.

Research career
Kovacs' teaching career, spanning over 12 years, started as an assistant professor at the University of Waterloo. She is now the senior research scientist for the Biodiversity Research Programme at the Centre for Ice Climate and Ecosystems (ICE) at the Norwegian Polar Institute, as well as a professor of biology at University Studies on Svalbard (UNIS).

During her 30-year long research career, Kovacs has studied marine mammal population ecology, biology conservation and management, including satellite tagging of bowhead whales since 2010, the biopsy sampling of whales since 2006, and extensive research on seals Kovacs has published over 300 publications, receiving over 18,000 citations, resulting in an h-index and i10-index of 69 and 226 respectively. Kovacs has also successfully facilitated cooperation between the tourism industry and researchers in the Arctic region.

Service 
Kovacs has been the President of the Society for Marine Mammalogy. She now plays an advisory role as Past President for Life, and is currently serving her second term as the Chair of the IUCN's Pinniped Specialist Group. She served as a representative to the Standing Scientific Group – Life Science under SCAR from 2012–2015, and as a member of Norway's delegation to the Scientific Committee for the Conservation of Antarctic Marine Living Resources.

Kovacs has held offices of Chairman to the Academic User's Board of the Huntsman Marine Science Centre (1985– 1992), a member of the Board of Directors for the Huntsman Marine Science Centre (1990–1994), was the secretary of the Canadian National Council for the International Union of Biological Studies (NSERC) from 1989–1992, and editorial board Member for the Canadian Journal of Zoology from 1990–1994, a board member for the Arctic Light and Heat (ALV) Programme from Jan 1997– December 31, 2002, at the Norwegian National Research Council, the president of the International Society for Marine Mammalogy from 2004–2006 and is still a member of its scientific advisory council and conservation council,l a member of the Arctic Climate Biodiversity's Impact Assessment Working Group, as well as a contributing author to the ACIA (Arctic Climate Impact Assessment) report in Chapter 9: Marine Systems and Chapter 11: Management and Conservation of Wildlife in a Changing Arctic Environment.

Kovacs was a committee member in 2003–2006 for the Natural Environment Research Council (NERC, United Kingdom) Special Committee on Seals (SCOS). Kovacs was an International coordinator for the Ringed Seal Circumpolar Network at the Conservation of Arctic Flora and Fauna (CAFF) from 2000–2008, a member and leader of the Impacts on Sea Ice Reductions in the NorACIA (Norwegian Arctic Climate Impact Assessment) – Group III, as well as a member of the Barend Sea Advisory Group at NorACIA.

Kovacs is currently on the steering committee for the IUCN Species Survival Commission (SSC) Climate Change Specialist Group, a member of the Biodiversity Centre Programme Scientific Committee (Polar Environmental Centre) since 2001, has been on the Scientific Advisory Board Member for the American Cetacean Society since 2004, serves on the Committee for Scientific Advisers and the Conservation Committee for the Society for Marine Mammalogy, is a member of the Norwegian Scientific Academy for Polar Research and is on the EU Life Sciences Standing Committee, representing Norway.

Kovacs was also the leader of Marine Mammals Exploring the Oceans Pole to Pole (MEOP) project during the International Polar Year, and worked on the Barents Sea walrus Ecology project, which focused on studying stock structure, movement patterns and general ecology of Barents Sea walruses in collaboration with Russia (2014–15) and on Pechora walrus abundance, which focused on the abundance determination of Pechora Sea walruses in collaboration with Russia (2011–12).

Awards and honors

 Lakehead University Graduate Entrance Scholarship (1979/80)
 Thunder Bay Field Naturalists' Award (1980/81) 
 Ontario Graduate Scholarship (1980–1982)
 AOU Best Student Paper Award (1081/81) 
 Multiple NSERC Postgraduate Science Scholarships (1981/82, 1982/83, 1983/84)
 Commonwealth Scholarship (1982/83)
 University of Guelph Graduate Fellowship (1982/83)
 Norman James Aquatic Mammals Fellowship in 1985 
 NSERC/NATO Postdoctoral Fellowship (1986/87)

References

External links

German women scientists
Norwegian women scientists
Canadian women biologists
20th-century Canadian women scientists
21st-century Canadian women scientists
Year of birth missing (living people)
Living people
Canadian mammalogists
Canadian expatriates in Norway
York University alumni
Lakehead University alumni
University of Guelph alumni
Academic staff of the University of Waterloo
Academic staff of the University Centre in Svalbard
20th-century German scientists
21st-century German scientists
20th-century Canadian biologists
21st-century Canadian biologists
21st-century Norwegian scientists
German emigrants to Canada
German mammalogists
20th-century German women
20th-century Norwegian women
21st-century German women